The Latin Grammy Award for Best Norteño Album is an honor presented annually at the Latin Grammy Awards, a ceremony that recognizes excellence and creates a wider awareness of cultural diversity and contributions of Latin recording artists in the United States and internationally. The award goes to solo artists, duos, or groups for releasing vocal or instrumental albums containing at least 51% of new recordings in the norteño genre.

Los Tigres del Norte are the most awarded performers with four accolades in this category and they were also the first recipient of this award in 2000 for the album Herencia de Familia. Other multiple winners are Ramón Ayala y Sus Bravos Del Norte and Grupo Pesado both winners in two years in a row from 2001 to 2002 and 2009 to 2010 respectively.

The award has only been presented to musicians originating from Mexico, winning seven times, and the United States, winning five times.

Winners and nominees

2000s

2010s

2020s

 Each year is linked to the article about the Latin Grammy Awards held that year.

See also
 Grammy Award for Best Norteño Album
 Regional styles of Mexican music

References

General
  Note: User must select the "Regional Field" category as the genre under the search feature.

Specific

External links
Official site of the Latin Grammy Awards

 
Norteño albums
Norteno Album
Norteno Album